Peter Irwin Cape (19 January 1926 – 30 May 1979) was a New Zealand singer, songwriter, writer and radio producer. He is best remembered for his simple folk songs, including "Taumarunui On The Main Trunk Line", "She'll Be Right" and "Coffee Bar Blues".

Early life
Cape was born in Helensville, north-west of Auckland. He was educated by Correspondence School, and in the 1940s he went on to study for a Bachelor of Arts in English, philosophy and psychology at The University of Auckland, where he was the Craccum editor for part of 1948, and then 1949. After graduating, he worked for a time as a freelance journalist.

Career 
In the 1950s, Cape undertook theological studies at Selwyn College, after which he was ordained as an Anglican priest. He subsequently took a job as talks producer for the New Zealand Broadcasting Service. His first songs were recorded in 1958. He is best remembered for his songs "Taumarunui On The Main Trunk Line", "She'll Be Right" and "Coffee Bar Blues". His music is often seen as capturing a deliberately rural and disconnected side of New Zealand that was not shown by contemporary artists, with most music performed in New Zealand during his career being covers, or otherwise heavily influenced by international trends.

In 1963 he was promoted to director of religious and arts programmes at the New Zealand Broadcasting Service. In the 1960s, Cape also served as the Director of Volunteer Service Abroad. In later life Cape authored a number of books on New Zealand's contemporary visual arts and fine artists. He also wrote an autobiography, titled An Ordinary Joker.

Personal life
In 1952 he married Barbara Henderson. The marriage ended in divorce in the 1970s. He lived in Richmond until his death 1979 at the age of 53. His ashes were buried in Kaukapakapa, near his birthplace, in 2019.

Discography
A selection of Cape's recordings are listed below:

 All Black Jerseys
 Black Matai
 Bullocky
 Charlie's Bash
 Coffee-Bar Blues
 Down the Hall on Saturday Night
 Feet Fish
 Fetch 'Em On
 Gumdigger
 I Don't Want To Be a Kiwi
 Inter-Island steamer Express
 May, The Drover's Daughter
 Nativity (New Zealand Christmas)
 Okaihau Express
 Old Joe Becher and Young Joe Bayer
 Poor Unfortunate Boy
 Pussycat
 Rainbird
 Scotty The Roadman
 She'll Be Right
 She's A Great Little Town
 Spell-Oh!
 Talking Dog
 Taumarunui On The Main Trunk Line
 Taumata...
 The Monde Marie
 The Stable Lad
 The Swagger
 Tramcar
 You Can't Win

References

External links
 Peter Cape - A Search for National Identity

1926 births
1979 deaths
20th-century New Zealand male singers
People from Helensville
University of Auckland alumni